Tennille, also spelled as Tennile is an unincorporated community in Pike County, Alabama. It is located 17 miles southeast of Troy, Alabama.

History
A post office was established as Tennile in 1890, and remained in operation until it was discontinued in 1958.

Geography
Tennille is just over one mile north of the Pea River, which separates Pike County from Dale County.

References

Unincorporated communities in Pike County, Alabama
Unincorporated communities in Alabama